The Teams event of the tournament 2015 BWF World Junior Championships is held on November 4–8. The defending champions of the last edition is China.

Group stage

Group A

Group A1

Group A2

Group A play-offs

Group B

Group B1

Group B2

Group B play-offs

Group C

Group C1

Group C2

Group C play-offs

Group D

Group D1

Group D2

Group D play-offs

Final stage

1st to 4th

5th to 8th

9th to 12th

13th to 16th

17th to 20th

21st to 24th

25th to 28th

29th to 32nd

33rd to 36th

37th to 39th

Final team ranking

 [1]
 [3/4]
 [5/8]
 [3/4]
 [5/8]
 [5/8]
 [9/16]
 [5/8]
 [9/16]
 [2]
 [9/16]
 [9/16]
 [9/16]
 [9/16]
 [9/16]
 [9/16]

 (Withdrew)

References

Teams
World Junior